CBS Children's Mystery Theatre is an American television anthology series aimed at teens and pre-teens. A total of five episodes were produced by and aired on CBS from 1980–83. Episode titles were The Treasure of Alpheus T. Winterborn, The Haunting of Harrington House, Mystery of Fire Island, The Zertigo Diamond Caper, and Dirkham Detective Agency.

The stories were written to emphasis the importance of deductive reasoning.

Stars included Edie Adams, Roscoe Lee Browne, and Sally Kellerman.

References

External links

1980s American anthology television series
1980 American television series debuts
1983 American television series endings
CBS original programming